The 1979–80 Alabama Crimson Tide men's basketball team represented the University of Alabama in the 1979–80 NCAA Division I men's basketball season. The team's head coach was C.M. Newton, who was in his 12th season at Alabama. The team played their home games at Coleman Coliseum in Tuscaloosa, Alabama. They finished the season 18–12, 12–6 in SEC play, finishing in a tie for third place.

The Tide reached the second round of the SEC tournament, where they lost to LSU.  Afterwards, the Tide accepted a bid to the 1980 National Invitation Tournament and reached the second round where they lost to Murray State University.

The team lost Reggie King from the previous season to the NBA's Kansas City Kings.  The Tide's key freshman signees were guards Mike Davis and  Vance Wheeler and forwards Cliff Windham and Eugene Jones.

After the season, coach C.M. Newton resigned to become an assistant commissioner of the Southeastern Conference.  After a year in the position, Newton was hired as coach at Vanderbilt University.

Roster

References 

Alabama Crimson Tide men's basketball seasons
Alabama
Alabama
1979 in sports in Alabama
1980 in sports in Alabama